The 2009–10 Louisiana–Lafayette Ragin' Cajuns women's basketball team represented the University of Louisiana at Lafayette during the 2009–10 NCAA Division I women's basketball season. The Ragin' Cajuns were led by third-year head coach Errol Rogers; they played their double-header home games at the Cajundome with other games at the Earl K. Long Gymnasium, which is located on campus. They were members in the Sun Belt Conference. They finished the season 10–22, 4–14 in Sun Belt play to finish in a three-way tie for fifth place in the West Division. They were eliminated in the first round of the Sun Belt women's tournament.

Previous season 
The Ragin' Cajuns finished the 2008–09 season 4–27, 0–18 in Sun Belt play to finish in seventh place in the West Division. They made it to the 2009 Sun Belt Conference women's basketball tournament, losing in the first round game by a score of 65-68 to the Troy Trojans. They were not invited to any other postseason tournament.

Roster

Schedule and results

|-
!colspan=6 style=| Non-conference regular season

|-
!colspan=6 style=| Sun Belt regular season

|-
!colspan=6 style=| Non–conference regular season

|-
!colspan=6 style=| Sun Belt regular season

|-
!colspan=6 style=| Non-conference regular season

|-
!colspan=6 style=| Sun Belt regular season

|-
!colspan=6 style=| Sun Belt Women's Tournament

See also
 2009–10 Louisiana–Lafayette Ragin' Cajuns men's basketball team

References

Louisiana Ragin' Cajuns women's basketball seasons
Louisiana-Lafayette
Louisiana
Louisiana